Guam competed at the 1996 Summer Olympics in Atlanta, United States.

Results by event

Athletics 
Women's Marathon
 Marie Benito → 65th place (3:27.28)

Swimming
Men's 50m Freestyle
 Darrick Bollinger
 Heat – 23.97 (→ did not advance, 46th place)

Men's 100m Butterfly
 Patrick Sagisi
 Heat – 56.93 (→ did not advance, 51st place)

Wrestling

References
Official Olympic Reports

Nations at the 1996 Summer Olympics
1996
Olympic